Onepoto is a locality of Porirua City in New Zealand.   It is bounded to the north by Whitireia Park, a large park which is slowly being returned to native bush, and to the east by the Porirua Harbour.

Onepoto covers a land area of 2.24 km², including an area of coast.

The New Zealand Ministry for Culture and Heritage translates Onepoto as "short beach".

Demography

Onepoto had a population of 1,917 at the 2018 New Zealand census, an increase of 117 people (6.5%) since the 2013 census, and an increase of 72 people (3.9%) since the 2006 census. There were 624 households. There were 936 males and 978 females, giving a sex ratio of 0.96 males per female. The median age was 35.3 years (compared with 37.4 years nationally), with 468 people (24.4%) aged under 15 years, 345 (18.0%) aged 15 to 29, 882 (46.0%) aged 30 to 64, and 222 (11.6%) aged 65 or older.

Ethnicities were 70.1% European/Pākehā, 32.2% Māori, 18.0% Pacific peoples, 4.5% Asian, and 3.0% other ethnicities (totals add to more than 100% since people could identify with multiple ethnicities).

The proportion of people born overseas was 17.2%, compared with 27.1% nationally.

Although some people objected to giving their religion, 52.7% had no religion, 35.1% were Christian, 0.2% were Hindu, 0.6% were Muslim, 0.8% were Buddhist and 3.1% had other religions.

Of those at least 15 years old, 333 (23.0%) people had a bachelor or higher degree, and 249 (17.2%) people had no formal qualifications. The median income was $36,800, compared with $31,800 nationally. The employment status of those at least 15 was that 840 (58.0%) people were employed full-time, 171 (11.8%) were part-time, and 63 (4.3%) were unemployed.

Economy

In 2018, 11.9% of the workforce worked in healthcare, 11.3% worked in construction, 10.7% worked in education, 4.5% worked in manufacturing, 4.5% worked in transport and 3.9% worked in hospitality.

Transportation

As of 2018, among those who commute to work, 70.9% drove a car, 4.7% rode in a car, 0.9% used a bike, and 0.9% walked or ran. No one used public transport.

References

Porirua